Saracens Rugby Club is an English professional rugby union club based in North London, England. As of the current 2022–23 season, they compete in Premiership Rugby, the highest tier competition in English rugby, as well as the domestic Premiership Rugby Cup and the European Rugby Champions Cup.

Established in 1876, the club has spent most of its existence in and around Southgate in the London Borough of Enfield. Since 2012, Saracens have played their home games at Copthall stadium (or StoneX Stadium for sponsorship reasons) in Hendon, in the borough of Barnet. Before this, they played at Vicarage Road in Watford for 15 years. The club's home kit playing colours are black and red. They are also affiliated with the Saracens Women team, which competes in the top tier Premier 15s competition.

Saracens have won 10 major trophies. They were European champions three times, in 2016, 2017 and 2019. They have won the English Premiership five times, most recently in 2019, and won the domestic cup twice in 1998 and 2015. They have also won the second division title three times, in 1989, 1995 and 2021.

History

Origins

Saracens were founded in 1876 by the Old Boys of the Philological School in Marylebone, London (later to become St Marylebone Grammar School). The club's name is said to come from the "endurance, enthusiasm and perceived invincibility of Saladin's desert warriors of the 12th century". The fact that their local rivals were called the "Crusaders" may also have been a factor. The Crescent and Star appearing in the club's emblem are reminiscent of those appearing on the flag of Tunisia.

Saracens amalgamated with neighbouring club Crusaders two years later. In 1892, Saracens moved from Crown Lane, Southgate, to Firs Farm, Winchmore Hill then played on nine different grounds before the move to Bramley Road, Southgate, for the 1939–40 season (although the Second World War actually prevented them from playing there until 1945).

After their inaugural match against Blackheath, the Saracens had to wait another 9 years before Harlequins offered to include them on their fixture list. Saracens found it difficult to get games against first-class sides as the facilities at Bramley Road were so poor.

The club produced a number of internationals in pre-league era, such as hooker John Steeds who won five caps representing England from 1949 to 1950; Vic Harding, a lock also for England from 1961 to 1962; and George Sheriff, an England back-rower from 1966 to 1967.

The club enjoyed fixtures with the leading clubs for many years and enjoyed a particularly successful time in the 1970s when they reached the semi-finals of the National Cup. Special games played at Bramley Road during this period include the 1971 match against a select International XV. The game was reportedly attended by a 5,000 strong crowd (the largest ever to watch a rugby union game in North London at the time) came to watch a magnificent contest, ending Saracens 34 International XV 34.

This Saracens team also won the 1972 Middlesex Cup beating Met Police in the final.

The Courage leagues
After some bleak years in the early 1980s, the club responded to the challenge of the Courage Leagues, and with Floyd Steadman as captain and Tony Russ as coach, they won the second division in 1989 with a 100% record. The next year in the first division they surprised many by finishing fourth in the league behind Wasps, Gloucester and Bath.

But within the space of two years, Saracens had lost Jason Leonard to Harlequins, Dean Ryan to Wasps and Ben Clarke to Bath and they were fast becoming a nursery for the more prestigious clubs. The 1992–93 season saw the leagues restructured with Saracens, along with three other clubs, being relegated to the second division. In 1993–94 Saracens finished third and narrowly missed out on promotion but the following year they finished as champions and were again back in the top flight.

Former player David Wellman was given the task to rebrand Saracens. He gave former player Mike Smith the remit to take Saracens professional. A benefactor was required in order to improve the ground and playing staff. Alas Saracens' seesaw existence over the nineties was about to continue in 1995–96 when they again found themselves at the wrong end of the table along with West Hartlepool but they were saved by their new CEO Mike Smith, who persuaded the RFU that there should be no relegation for the first season of professional rugby.

The professional era

1996–2000
In November 1995 Saracens gained the financial backing of Nigel Wray and this enabled the club to recruit the likes of Michael Lynagh, Philippe Sella, Francois Pienaar and Kyran Bracken. Saracens moved again to Enfield F.C.'s ground, Southbury Road, and they started the new season with a victory over title favourites Leicester but only finished seventh just missing out on Heineken Cup qualification.

The 1997–98 season, was a landmark year. They began a ground share with Watford FC and their 22,000 all seater Vicarage Road Stadium. The agreement ran until February 2013, when Saracens relocated to Barnet Copthall.

The appointment of Peter Deakin as Chief Executive saw Saracens splashed all over the broadsheets, tabloids, magazines and TV and with the help of a small band of be-fezzed followers that had been following the club for a number of years, "the year of the Fez" began.

Close season signings like Danny Grewcock, Roberto Grau, Gavin Johnson and Ryan Constable joined forces with the home grown talent of Tony Diprose, Richard Hill and Steve Ravenscroft to form a side that would prove a significant force during the season losing only three games during the season to finish second in the Premiership, missing out narrowly to Newcastle, another club that had embraced the changes that the professional game had brought. Newcastle haven't repeated this success since.

Consolation for missing out on the league title came in the then principal domestic cup competition, the Tetley Bitter Cup. Saracens beat Wasps 48–18 in the cup final at Twickenham, in doing so equalling Bath's cup-final record score of 48 points. Their run had included a 59-point win over Blackheath, a 14–13 victory over Leicester, a quarter final 36–30 win over Richmond, followed by a victory over Northampton. It was the first major silverware that Saracens had won in their 122-year history. The game was also notable for being the last competitive game for two legends of the sport, Lynagh and Sella; some years later these same two players became the inaugural members of Saracen's Hall of Fame.

After a solid start to 1998–99 season, Saracens were rocked in December when they lost to third from bottom London Scottish in a shock defeat at home, but a win against Bedford and West Hartlepool and a draw with Wasps still saw them in touch with leaders Leicester. The second half of the season was a roller coaster ride with Saracens going from eighth and out of European contention after a run of four losses, to eventually finishing third as London's top club.

The 1999–2000 season saw more big name players move to Vicarage Road with Mark Mapletoft, Thierry Lacroix, Scott Murray and Dan Luger joining the club along with Darragh O'Mahony and the up-and-coming Julian White. With the squad ravaged by World Cup duty and then injury the club's first attempt at the Heineken Cup was not a happy one. They lost three games by a couple of points in the last seconds of the game and didn't make the quarter finals.

With a few games left they were looking at a possible failure to qualify for Europe again, but Kyran Bracken returned from a ten-month injury to inspire Saracens into fourth place and Heineken Cup qualification.

2000–2006
2000–01 saw another difficult start to the season. By October Saracens had effectively crashed out of the Heineken Cup with back to back defeats to Cardiff and with the team shorn of internationals due to the Autumn Tests the final blow was dealt when Thomas Castaignède suffered an Achilles tendon injury.

The results went downhill fast and a fifth-place finish saw the club miss out on a Heineken Cup place.

The 2001–02 season brought many changes, with established players such as Luger, Grewcock, White, Wallace and, much to the consternation of his loyal fan club, Tony Diprose, all leaving the club. Further weakened with the news that Castaignède was likely to miss the whole of the coming season, Francois Pienaar, now in full control of coaching operations opted to make use of a crop of younger players coming through the club system.

After a reasonable start to the season Saracens found themselves in their by then accustomed top half of the table position but then the curse of the Autumn Internationals once again took its toll, and Saracens' performances weakened drastically. Entering the New Year Saracens were again flirting with relegation danger, and soon exited all cup competitions. With morale sinking Pienaar stepped down from his various roles with the club after a five-year stay.

Lacking a coach the senior players took charge, the morale problem seemed to have passed, but results remained sketchy and the Saracens ended up in a lowly 10th place.

All Black legend Buck Shelford took over the coaching reins for the 2002–03 season, while the playing squad saw the arrival of the likes of Andy Goode, Christian Califano, Craig Quinnell amongst several signings of established players. In a repetition of the pattern of some of the preceding seasons, Saracens once again got off to a flying start, beating Bath and Bristol.

Once again though, sound defeats, this season administered by London rivals, Wasps and Irish, seemed to shatter the team's confidence, to such an extent that once again by early in the new year Saracens were once again uncomfortably close to the relegation zone, the only real success coming in an impressive run in the European Challenge Cup.

The club once again rallied towards the tail end of the season, with victories over Bristol, and then high flying Sale securing a 5th place in the table that seemed unlikely at the turn of the year, and a place in the play off system for the remaining European Cup place. A comfortable win over fourth placed Leeds in the play off semi-final brought an astonishingly tight final against Leicester.

With temperatures soaring at Franklin's Gardens, 80 minutes was not enough to separate the teams, with a late rally by Saracens tying the scores at 20–20. Ultimately, a Neil Back try was to see Leicester through, but at least it appeared that Saracens had rediscovered their fighting spirit.

The late rally was not enough to save Shelford, and he and most of the rest of the coaching staff paid the price for the weak season, being replaced by the experienced Australia and Leicester player, Rod Kafer, at that time a relative newcomer to a coaching roll, for the 2003–04 season. Key signings included Fijian Simon Raiwalui, former French captain Raphaël Ibañez, Springbok Cobus Visagie and All Black Taine Randell.

The club's finances were also diversified with Nigel Wray divesting himself of nearly 50% of his shares to spread the financial cost and risk of supporting Saracens. This led to the addition of five new members being appointed to the Saracens' board.

The change of faces did little to change the pattern of consistent inconsistency of previous seasons. Once again, the early rounds saw a false dawn as Saracens found themselves in the top three, and again the club coped badly with the international call-ups for the 2003 World Cup, once again finding themselves near the foot of the table. Only the long gap to bottom place Rotherham avoided any serious relegation danger. The victorious return of Richard Hill and Kyran Bracken from World Cup duty brought somewhat more upbeat performances for the second half of the season, but it still took a rare away victory at London Irish to claim the same 10th place of two seasons before.

2004–05 saw a bold strengthening of the squad, for once eschewing their cosmopolitan recruitment policy and securing mainly English based players, possibly with one eye on the effect that international call-ups had had in previous seasons. In came Kevin Yates, Iain Fullarton, Alex Sanderson, Dan Scarbrough and Hugh Vyvyan, while Matt Cairns returned to the club and Steve Diamond arrived at the club as forwards coach. Another signing who was to become a prominent part of the Saracens' line up was fly half Glen Jackson from New Zealand.

The season got off to the best off all possible starts with Saracens scoring a victory over reigning champions Wasps at the first ever London 'Double Header' at Twickenham. Once again, Saracens' winter malaise struck, and after inconsistent performances, Diamond took over the coaching duties from Kafer. The New Year brought a string of convincing performances, and a long unbeaten run saw the club finish the season in the top half of the table, in fifth place.

Once again in the wild card system for a European Cup place, Worcester were comfortably beaten, setting up the chance to end the season where it had begun, back at Twickenham. A late try secured victory over Gloucester and a place in the next season's Heineken Cup was ensured.

There was further shuffling of the coaching pack in 2005–06 with Diamond becoming Director of Rugby and defensive coach Mike Ford taking over the front line coaching role. In a reversal of the previous season's outcome Saracens lost their opening double-header game against Wasps, but unlike some previous seasons, this did not immediately trigger a run of bad results, and indeed until December Saracens progressed well. The Christmas season saw the start of a calamitous dip in form and going into the final months of the season the prospect of ending up in another relegation scrap seemed very real.

Diamond parted company with the club, with Ford taking over full control of the team, assisted by future England coach Eddie Jones in a consulting role. Results improved, and an away win at Sale who were to be champions that season even brought the prospect of another Heineken cup place.

A few disappointing results at the end of the season took some of the shine off the improved run of form, with Saracens ending the season in 10th place. The season's end also brought to a close the distinguished playing career of Kyran Bracken.

2006–07

With Mike Ford being offered a role in the England set-up, former Leinster, Munster and Australia coach Alan Gaffney was appointed coach for the 2006 campaign. Among the new signings was South African, Neil de Kock, a player who was influential in the club's best season since 2000. Once again, Saracens were narrowly defeated by Wasps in the London double-header.

This was to be followed by what turned out to be a good away draw at Bristol in the context of the excellent season that Bristol would go on to have, before a bonus point win was secured against the Newcastle Falcons. A morale-boosting run of results followed, losing only three times between October and the following March. No individual result could quite produce the reaction that the return of England's Richard Hill to top flight action, with supporters of both clubs giving Hill a huge ovation on his return to the pitch after 18 months of knee reconstruction, capping off his comeback with a try.

This period also saw the long-awaited arrival of former Great Britain Rugby League captain, Andy Farrell, initially at flanker, but later at centre, the position at which he went on to take his England debut.

With the prospect of a place in the Premiership play-offs becoming ever more real, Saracens were also progressing well in the European Challenge Cup. They qualified for the knockout stages as second seeds, with only an away draw at Glasgow spoiling their group stage progression. A further win at the quarter-final stage against Glasgow saw Saracens host Bath for the semi-final, only to lose to ultimate runners up of the competition.

Results in the Premiership went Saracens' way, leaving them with the possibility of ending up anywhere from second to fifth as the final round of matches approached. After a day of games almost all of which had significant consequences in terms of positions at the top, and at the foot of the table, Saracens found themselves in the Premiership playoffs for the first time, squeezing Wasps into a rare 5th-place position, out of playoff contention.

The campaign was to end with a heavy defeat away at Gloucester, however, overall the season represented a significant advance on those of recent years. After the end of the season there was to be personal success for Glen Jackson, whose league topping 400 points for the season and consistent high-level performances almost every week saw him awarded the PRA Player of the Year Award by his fellow professionals. On a sadder note the mercurial Thomas Castaignède, one of the most enduringly popular players at the club decided to bring his club rugby career to an end after providing many years of entertaining rugby at its best both for Saracens and France.

2007–08

Preparation for the 2007–08 seasons saw somewhat less activity in comings and goings from the squad, reflecting the relatively solid 2006–07 season. Among signings to date, specialist cover for Glen Jackson came in the form of Scotland fly half Gordon Ross, while South African utility back Brent Russell was highly regarded by many Springbok fans.

The most spectacular signing though was that of All Black second row Chris Jack, widely regarded as the world's best in his position, who joined Saracens after the 2007 World Cup. In addition to his all-round game, Saracens hoped that Jack would bring some solidity to a Saracens' line-out which was one of the areas where they were consistently pressured in the previous season. The estimated value of Jack's contract raised eyebrows with a three-year contract at a total value of £750,000.

The loss of Glen Jackson and Brent Russell for the opening of the season due to pre-season injuries represented a significant blow to the club, but nonetheless the season began well with a return to winning ways against Wasps in the opening day London double-header. Defeat at the first home game by early pace setters Gloucester brought the team down to earth, before a solid away win at struggling Leeds, revenge for the previous season's home and away defeats away at Worcester, and a win back at Vicarage Road over Leicester. Defensive frailties saw Saracens go into the Autumn Premiership break for cup matches third in the table, but also with the third worst defensive record, after a defeat away at Sale.

The first round of cup competition saw Saracens win comfortably away at Leeds in the EDF Energy Cup, despite conceding four tries. Another bonus point win over Bristol back at Vicarage Road positioned Saracens well with maximum points ahead of a difficult away trip to Llanelli. Turning to Europe, Saracens' return to Heineken Cup action also saw the return of Glasgow Warriors to Vicarage Road. As in the two European Challenge Cup home games against the same team in the previous season, Saracens ran out bonus point winners, albeit not without defensive frailties causing anxious moments going into the final minutes of the game. The following weekend Saracens lost out by a single point against Biarritz Olympique being denied by a penalty scored from the half-way line in the dying moments of the match.

The brief return to Guinness Premiership action at the end of November saw Saracens come out top in a tight battle at home against London Irish, with the lead changing hands several times. Cup action in the form of the final round of EDF Energy Cup pool stage games, where Saracens failed once again to win away in Wales, but taking a losing bonus point and a try bonus too was enough to see them qualify for the semi-final stage for the first time in their Anglo-Welsh cup history, ahead of their opponents Llanelli Scarlets. Further progress was then made in the Heineken Cup in an impressive ten try to one defeat of Viadana at home in a game which saw the first team debuts for Chris Jack and Brent Russell. Viadana almost took their revenge in the return fixture the following week, where Saracens conceded a 26–3 half time lead to the Italians, before showing composure in the second half to score 31 unanswered points and take the win that would see them enter the New Year at the head of their Heineken Cup pool.

The return to premiership action over Christmas and the New Year began well for Saracens with a win away at London rivals Harlequins, however once again defensive weakness and coming out of the blocks slowly saw Saracens take only a losing bonus point from their final fixture of 2007 in the Premiership, though it was enough to see them go into the New Year in third place in the domestic league.

The buildup to the first game of 2008 was dominated by talk away from the field of play, with the news that former Wallaby coach Eddie Jones was to succeed Alan Gaffney at the top of the coaching subject with Gaffney adopting the same consulting role Jones had been providing, while rumours of substantial cash investment from South African rugby interests abounded. When the focus returned to on-field matters Saracens suffered a second successive defeat in the Premiership, this time away at Bristol, failing even to take a losing bonus point for the first time in any competition in the season and raising fears of the all too familiar Saracens' winter slump.

2009–10
The arrival of Brendan Venter to the head coach role sparked major controversy. Shortly after arrival he triggered the culling of 18 players within 48 hours, known among fans as "the night of the long knives", this would then be followed up by the arrival of a number of South Africans to the squad. This caused the club to be strongly criticised as they were seen to be swaying away from being an English club. Some even began calling the club "Saffracens", due to their strong South African links (Saffa being slang for South African).

This didn't stop Saracens going on a 10-match unbeaten run at the start of the domestic season which saw wins over London Irish (at Twickenham in the London Double Header), Northampton (at Wembley), London Wasps and Bath.

On 16 November a Derick Hougaard drop goal saw a one-point win over South Africa at Wembley. Viewed by some as a notable example of the South Africa excessive presence (Saracens fielded 9 South Africans), Saracens managed to overturn a 6–18 half time deficit to win 24–23. Generating greater publicity than the actual game was Stuart Tinner managing to win £250,000 by kicking a ball to directly hit the crossbar of the posts.

27 December saw Saracens lose away to London Irish, which was their first defeat of the domestic league competition, having had one draw and two losses in all competitions before this date. What followed was five defeats in the next six games; Leicester, Wasps, Bath and Leeds Carnegie all defeated Saracens, accompanied with being knocked out of the Amlin Challenge Cup despite losing only one match.

The post-Christmas slump in form for Saracens looked all too familiar. Yet a change in playing style and having found a new sense of attacking rugby, Sarries stopped the rot with a 58–15 drubbing of struggling Newcastle. From then on, they went on to win four out the five matches played, including impressive wins away to Sale, Northampton and table-topping Leicester Tigers.

This drastic change in form secured Saracens' Guinness Premiership Semi-Final spot in a respectable 3rd place and now faced Northampton Saints, the fifth time this season, away at Franklin's Gardens looking to end a streak of six semi-final losses in all competitions in the last three-years. Saracens defeated Northampton 21–19 in an all-mighty clash, with Glen Jackson ensuring that Sarries reached their first final since 1998 with a late kick, converting Schalk Brits's driving-maul try.

The 2010 Guinness Premiership Final at Twickenham, pitted Saracens against the eight-time and reigning English Champions, Leicester Tigers. In a pulsating game of rugby, Leicester sneaked Saracens to a 33–27 win with a late try to Dan Hipkiss providing the difference after Saracens flyhalf Glen Jackson had kicked what looked to be the winning penalty with only a few minutes left. Heartbreak for Sarries and their fans, but it just wasn't to be a fairy-tale ending for a remarkable season.

The final also marked the last match for a number of players including Fabio Ongaro, Matías Agüero, former All Black Justin Marshall and loyal fly-half Glen Jackson.

2010–11: Premiership champions
Saracens opened the 2010–11 season with a loss to London Irish in the opener of the London Double Header at Twickenham, Following the loss, their form improved as they ran off four wins in succession before a shock loss to Premiership newcomers Exeter Chiefs. They crashed out of the Heineken Cup in the pool stage, finishing bottom of a tough pool that featured Leinster, the ultimate Heineken Cup winners, and Clermont and Racing Métro, both of which made the French semi-finals. Saracens' domestic form, however, proved much stronger; they secured a home semi-final with one league match left, defeating Harlequins on the final day to complete a run of ten straight victories, including away at Northampton, Wasps, Exeter and Leicester Tigers. In the regular season Saracens won more games than any other side −18 in total – only missing out on top spot in the league because of the bonus point system. Gloucester awaited the Men in Black in the Semi-Final at Vicarage Road. A nervy finish and a late penalty from young flyhalf Owen Farrell gave Sarries the 12–10 win they wanted to reach their second successive Premiership Final.

In the Final, they again faced Leicester Tigers in a dramatic encounter. Saracens dominated the first half, leading 16–9 at half-time thanks to a James Short try, and showed a strong defensive performance to keep out waves of Leicester attack. This culminated in a nine-minute period of extra time during which they defended over 30 phases of Leicester assault through the forwards while leading 22–18, finally being awarded a penalty to crown them English champions for the first time and get revenge against Leicester for the previous year's final. Schalk Brits, who set up James Short's try, was awarded Man of the Match.

Saracens also had one major off-field development during the season. Their landlord Watford FC activated a break clause in their groundshare deal, which at the time meant that Saracens needed a new home for the 2011–12 season. After looking at several venues in the area, Saracens announced on 10 November 2010 that it was in serious discussions with Barnet Borough Council about a move to the athletics stadium at the Barnet Copthall complex. Under the plan, Saracens would redevelop the stadium into a modern facility with 3,000 permanent seats and demountable stands to allow a rugby capacity of 10,000, and include the first artificial pitch in English rugby union.

Because of delays in the Barnet Copthall project, Saracens eventually reached an agreement with Watford to extend the groundshare at Vicarage Road for the 2011–12 season; the agreement covered at least 10 home matches that season.

2014–15: Premiership champions

Saracens started the 2014–15 with high-scoring victories against London rivals Wasps and Harlequins, and went on to finish the regular season in fourth place, qualifying for the play-offs. After beating first-placed Northampton 29–24 in the semi-final, Saracens met Bath in the final. Saracens scored three unanswered tries in the first half, and went on to win the game 28–16, becoming the first team to become Premiership champions from a fourth-place finish. They made it a double, with a 23–20 win against Exeter in the final of the Anglo-Welsh Cup, a last minute penalty from Ben Spencer claiming Saracen's second Cup win.

In the first iteration of the European Rugby Champions Cup Saracens made it to the Semi-Finals before losing to ASM Clermont. In the boardroom, CEO Edward Griffiths departed and was replaced by Heath Harvey, a former director at Club Wembley.

2019 salary cap infringement and relegation
In March 2019, allegations first emerged that Saracens might have broken Premiership Rugby's salary cap. Saracens' chairman Nigel Wray had been investing in companies alongside players such as Richard Wigglesworth, Mako Vunipola, Billy Vunipola and Maro Itoje. In June, Premiership Rugby announced that they would hold an investigation into Saracens.

In November 2019, they were found to have been in breach of the salary cap regulations due to failure to disclose player payments in the 2016–17, 2017–18 and 2018–19 seasons, which would have taken them over the £7 million senior player salary cap. They were handed a 35-point deduction for the 2019–20 Premiership Rugby season and fined £5.3 million. The judgement found that Saracens had been reckless in entering into the arrangements with players without disclosing them to Premiership Rugby.

On 2 January 2020 Chairman Nigel Wray stood down and former Chief Executive Office Edward Griffiths returned to the role he left in 2015 with Mittesh Velani moving into a consultancy position. Wray was replaced as Saracens' Chairman by Neil Golding on 9 January 2020.

On 18 January 2020, Premiership Rugby announced that Saracens would be relegated to the RFU Championship for the 2020–21 season. Premiership Rugby CEO Darren Childs said this punishment was due to Saracens' lack of cooperation in a mid-season audit to prove compliance in the 2019–20 season.

After pressure from Premiership Rugby and the media Lord Dyson's full report into Saracens' spending was published on 23 January 2020, it revealed the overspend was £1.1m in 2016–17, £98,000 in 2017–18 and £906,000 in 2018–19.  These included £923,947.63 of property investments between Nigel Wray and three unnamed Saracens' players. It also included Saracens' claim that the Salary Cap was unenforceable under competition law; this defence was rejected.

On 28 January 2020, Griffiths resigned as CEO after less than a month in charge and Premiership Rugby applied a further 70-point deduction for the 2019–20 season to ensure Saracens would finish bottom of the league table.

International relationships
Following the Saracens' tour of Japan, they have developed a relationship with Fukuoka Sanix Blues. They played Sanix at Global Arena at the start of Buck Shelford's reign as head coach and won comfortably, but they had a harder game on the same tour in Tokyo against Suntory Sungoliath.

In 2008–09, 50% of the club was bought by a South African consortium. Eddie Jones left mid-season and Brendan Venter was announced as the new Director of Rugby. Many players were 'culled' mid-season, to the outrage of the media. The changes in the club resulted in a dramatic turnaround in the club's fortunes, as they won their first eight games in the 2009–10 season, and finished 2009 on top of the Guinness Premiership. However, following a run of poor performances, they slipped to third finishing the season behind Leicester and Northampton.

Under the current ownership, Saracens have dramatically increased their international reach. They currently have established partner clubs in Georgia, Seattle, Abu Dhabi, Kuala Lumpur, Amman, Moscow, Kenya, São Paulo, and Tonga. According to CEO Edward Griffiths, "We estimate we could have 40 Saracens' players participating at the Rio Olympics under various national colours. And we have an advertising campaign running worldwide on CNBC."

2013 international encounters
In the summer of 2013, Saracens played two international matches. They beat the South African Barbarians on 16 May at Artillery Ground. They toured the Atlantic Ocean island Bermuda to promote rugby. They visited a number of schools, ran coaching workshops and engaged in fundraising activities while on tour. To finish, they played a Bermuda International Select XV, which included Simon Taylor, Mike Scholz, Zach Pangelinan, Shaun Perry and Gcobani Bobo who are all Internationally capped. The side was coached by former England international Lewis Moody and captained by former Ireland player Geordan Murphy.

2016 and 2017 matches in the United States
On 12 March 2016, Saracens' away Premiership match against London Irish was held at the Red Bull Arena in the U.S. state of New Jersey. This was the first time a Premiership match had taken place overseas. Saracens won by a score of 26–16.

Saracens returned to the United States when they were hosted by the Newcastle Falcons on 16 September 2017 at the Talen Energy Stadium in Philadelphia. Saracens won by a score of 29–7.

Current kit 
The kit is currently supplied by Castore, from the beginning of the 2021–22 season. The club's principal sponsor is City Index, a subsidiary company whose parent is owned by Saracens' principle partner StoneX. The replica kit featured the logo of the Saracens Foundation, a charity operated by the club and £5 of proceeds from each jersey are donated to the foundation.

Current standings

English Premiership

European Rugby Champions Cup

Season summaries 

Gold background denotes championsSilver background denotes runners-upPink background denotes relegated

Club honours

Saracens F.C. 
Premiership Rugby
Champions: (5) 2010–11, 2014–15, 2015–16, 2017–18, 2018–19
Runners–Up: (4) 1997–98, 2009–10, 2013–14, 2021–22
RFU Championship
Champions: (3) 1988–89, 1994–95, 2020–21
European Rugby Champions Cup
Champions: (3) 2015–16, 2016–17, 2018–19
Runners–Up: (1) 2013–14
Anglo–Welsh Cup
Champions: (2) 1997–98, 2014–15
Premiership Rugby Cup
Runners–Up: (1) 2018–19
Middlesex Senior Cup
Champions: (4) 1971–72, 1975–76, 1979–80, 1985–86
Runners–Up: (3) 1974–75, 1977–78, 1980–81

Saracens Storm Reserves 
Premiership Rugby Shield
Champions: (2) 2014–15, 2018–19
Runners-Up: (1) 2012–13

Saracens Sevens 
Premiership Rugby Sevens Series
Champions: (3) 2010, 2018, 2019
Runners–Up: (1) 2011
Melrose Sevens
Champions: (2) 2012, 2013

Current squad 

The Saracens senior squad for the 2022–23 season is:

Note: Players listed in bold have received at least one senior international test cap.

Academy squad 

The Saracens academy squad is:

Club staff

Coaching and ownership structure 
The current Saracens senior management and coaching staff is as follows:

Timeline of coaches (professional era)

Notable former coaches 
The following former Saracens assistant coaches – who all began their professional rugby coaching careers at the club – have gone on to serve in high-profile positions at international level and at other top-tier clubs in the English Premiership, the French Top 14 or the United Rugby Championship:

  Mike Ford (defence coach 2004–05, head coach 2005–06)
 England defence coach 2006–11
 Bath backs coach 2012–13, director of rugby 2013–16
 Toulon head coach 2016–17, Leicester defence coach 2019–21
  Andy Farrell (player 2005–09, backs coach 2009–11, head coach 2011–12)
 England defence coach 2012–15
 Munster technical advisor 2016
 Ireland defence coach 2016–19, head coach 2019–
  Paul Gustard (assistant coach 2008–09, defence coach 2009–16)
 England defence coach 2016–18
 Harlequins director of rugby 2018–21
 Benetton defence coach 2021–22, Stade Français defence coach 2022–
  Steve Borthwick (player/captain 2008–14, academy coach 2012–14)
 Japan forwards coach 2014–15, England forwards coach 2016–20
 Leicester director of rugby 2020–22
 England head coach 2022–
  Alex Sanderson (forwards coach 2008–16, defence coach 2016–21)
 Sale director of rugby 2021–
  Richard Wigglesworth (player 2010–20, academy coach 2017–20)
 Canada defence and kicking coach 2019
 Leicester attack coach 2021–22, interim head coach 2022–23
 England assistant coach 2023–
  Richard Hill (player 1993–2008, academy coach 2010–13)
 England team manager 2016–
  Mosese Rauluni (player 2004–10, academy coach 2010–12)
 Fiji backs coach 2011, defence and skills coach 2014–
  Andy Edwards (strength and conditioning coach 2006–20)
 England A fitness coach 2010–16
 South Africa athletic performance director 2020–
  Ian Vass (academy coach 2013–17)
 England U20s head coach 2017
 Montpellier defence coach 2017–20, Northampton defence coach 2020–

Notable players

British & Irish Lions 
The following players have been selected to represent the British & Irish Lions on tour while at Saracens:

Rugby World Cup 
The following players have been selected to represent their national teams at the Rugby World Cup while at Saracens (winners are listed in bold):

Halls of fame 
The following players have been inducted into the Saracens Hall of Fame:

  John Steeds (1938–1950)
  Tony Turner (1946–1949)
  Vic Harding (1951–1964)
  Ken Bartlett (1959–1962, 1967)
  James Wyness (1961–1968)
  George Sherriff (1963–1973)
  John Lockwood (1963–1977)
  Mel Williams (1966–1976)
  Floyd Steadman (1980–1990)
  Lee Adamson (1983–1994, 2000–2007)
  Brian Davies (1990–1996)
  John Buckton (1984–1996)
  Michael Lynagh (1996–1998)
  Philippe Sella (1996–1998)

In addition, several former Saracens players have been inducted into the two incarnations of the World Rugby Hall of Fame:

Club captains 
The following players have held the position of Saracens club captain:

 1876–1882 -  F.W. Dunn
 1882–1887 -  A. Jenkins
 1887–1890 -  G. Sparks
 1890–1891 -  J. Bongard
 1891–1893 -  H.E. Read
 1893–1896 -  W.T.A. Beare
 1896–1897 -  A. Warden
 1897–1899 -  W.T.A. Beare
 1899–1900 -  T. Sawyer
 1900–1901 -  W.T.A. Beare
 1901–1907 -  C.S. Bongard
 1907–1909 -  J.W. Jennings
 1909–1911 -  T.H. Pentony
 1911–1912 -  W.A. Andrew
 1912–1913 -  A.J. Wilson
 1913–1914 -  D. McMillan
 1919–1920 -  D.H. Keith
 1920–1921 -  G.P. Mayne
 1921–1922 -  F.S. Chaan
 1922–1923 -  T.F. Pilcher
 1923–1924 -  J.S. Greer
 1924–1925 -  W.T. Williams
 1925–1926 -  J.S. Greer
 1926–1927 -  K. Brown
 1927–1928 -  O.R.G. Williams
 1928–1929 -  L.C. Johnson
 1929–1930 -  W.L. Prosser
 1930–1933 -  K. Brown
 1933–1935 -  M. Barak
 1935–1936 -  E.O. Furness
 1936–1938 -  A.V.N. Bartlett
 1938–1939 -  G.J. Burkle
 1939–1940 -  P. Brown
 1940–1946 -  E. Heptonstall
 1946–1949 -  G.A. Turner
 1949–1950 -  R.D. Bruce
 1950–1952 -  L.W. Knowlson
 1952–1954 -  R.D. Bruce
 1954–1955 -  E.A. Eames
 1955–1956 -  R. Robertson
 1956–1957 -  V.S.J. Harding
 1957–1958 -  D.J. Dowling
 1958–1960 -  D.M. Thomas
 1960–1962 -  K.J. Bartlett
 1962–1965 -  J.A.D. Wyness
 1965–1968 -  G.D. Hunt
 1968–1970 -  R. Weaver
 1970–1972 -  J.A. Lockwood
 1972–1973 -  R. Headey
 1973–1974 -  J.M. Heggadon
 1974–1976 -  M. Williams
 1976–1977 -  J.A. Lockwood
 1977–1978 -  D. Harrigan
 1978–1981 -  R. Faircloth
 1981–1982 -  A. Harrower
 1982–1983 -  F. Steadman
 1983–1987 -  A. Keay
 1987–1988 -  L. Adamson
 1988–1990 -  F. Steadman
 1990–1992 -  J.R. Buckton
 1992–1996 -  B. Davies
 1996–1999 -  T. Diprose
 1999–2000 -  J.F. Pienaar
 2000–2001 -  K.P.P. Bracken
 2001–2002 -  A. Benazzi
 2002–2003 -  K.P.P. Bracken
 2003–2004 -  S. Raiwalui
 2004–2006 -  H.D. Vyvyan
 2006–2007 -  S. Raiwalui
 2007–2008 -  N. de Kock
 2008–2014 -  S.W. Borthwick
 2014–2016 -  A.J. Hargreaves
 2016–2020 -  B.M. Barritt
 2020–present -  O.A. Farrell

Notable former internationals 
The following former Saracens players received at least one international cap during their professional career for their respective national test or sevens teams:

England  

 Steffon Armitage
 Chris Ashton
 Brad Barritt
 Steve Borthwick
 Mouritz Botha
 Kyran Bracken
 John Buckton
 Matt Cairns
 Noah Cato
 Kris Chesney
 George Chuter
 Ben Clarke
 Tony Diprose
 Mike Ellery
 Andy Farrell
 David Flatman
 Andy Goode
 Joe Gray
 Danny Grewcock
 Richard Haughton
 Richard Hill
 Charlie Hodgson
 Michael Horak
 Ben Johnston
 George Kruis
 Jason Leonard
 Dan Luger
 Mark Mapletoft
 Nils Mordt
 Steve Ravenscroft
 Dean Ryan
 Alex Sanderson
 Dan Scarbrough
 David Seymour
 Jack Singleton
 Ben Skirving
 Ben Spencer
 Matt Stevens
 David Strettle
 Ben Sturnham
 Rob Thirlby
 Joel Tomkins
 Hugh Vyvyan
 Julian White
 Richard Wigglesworth
 Kevin Yates

Britain and Ireland 

  Kelly Brown
  Blair Cowan
  Iain Fullarton
  Jim Hamilton
  Scott Murray
  Gordon Ross
  Robbie Russell
  Tom Ryder
  Tim Swinson
  Rhys Carré
  Dominic Day
  Rhys Gill
  Gavin Henson
  Michael Owen
  Craig Quinnell
  Tom Shanklin
  Sam Wainwright
  Liam Williams
  Shane Byrne
  Paddy Johns
  Darragh O'Mahony
  Peter Stringer
  Paul Wallace
  Richard Wallace

Overseas 

  Marcelo Bosch
  Juan Figallo
  Roberto Grau
  Francisco Leonelli
  Juan Pablo Socino
  Mark Bartholomeusz
  Tim Horan
  Rod Kafer
  Michael Lynagh
  Dave Porecki
  Will Skelton
  Jared Barker
  Morgan Williams
  Sam Domoni
  Nicky Little
  Sakiusa Matadigo
  Simon Raiwalui
  Kameli Ratuvou
  Mosese Rauluni
  Michael Tagicakibau
  Abdelatif Benazzi
  Christian Califano
  Thomas Castaignède
  Raphaël Ibañez
  Thierry Lacroix
  Alain Penaud
  Philippe Sella
  Christopher Tolofua
  Justin Melck
  Matías Agüero
  Carlos Nieto
  Fabio Ongaro
  Samuela Vunisa
  Takashi Kikutani
  Jacques Burger
  Janco Venter
  Chris Jack
  Glen Jackson
  Joe Maddock
  Justin Marshall
  Taine Randell
  Jack Wilson
  Cătălin Fercu
  Jannie de Beer
  Neil de Kock
  Schalk Brits
  Schalk Burger
  Alistair Hargreaves
  Derick Hougaard
  Francois Hougaard
  Gavin Johnson
  Vincent Koch
  Francois Pienaar
  Brent Russell
  John Smit
  Wikus van Heerden
  Cobus Visagie
  Damian Willemse
  Census Johnston
  James Johnston
  Brendan Reidy
  Hisa Sasagi
  Pelu Taele
  Viliami Hakalo
  Tevita Vaikona
  Sione Vailanu
  Will Hooley
  Titi Lamositele
  Thretton Palamo
  Hayden Smith
  Chris Wyles

Personnel honours and records

Most appearances 
The following players have the most appearances for Saracens:

  Alex Goode (352), 2008–present
  Kris Chesney (338), 1995–2009
  John Buckton (319), 1984–1996
  Kevin Sorrell (304), 1995–2010
  Jackson Wray (301), 2008–present
  Richard Hill (275), 1993–2008
  Neil de Kock (257), 2006–2017
  Chris Wyles (254), 2008–2018
  Brad Barritt (252), 2008–2020
  Richard Wigglesworth (240), 2010–2020

World Rugby Awards 
The following Saracens players have achieved recognition at the World Rugby Awards (presented annually since 2001):

Six Nations Championship Awards 
The following players have been named on either the Six Nations Player of the Championship or Team of the Championship shortlist while at Saracens:

European Player of the Year Awards 
The following Saracens players have been named as nominees and winners of the EPCR European Player of the Year award (presented annually since 2011):

Highest scorers by European season 
The following lists denote the top points scorers and top try scorers for Saracens during each European season from 2011–12 onwards:

Premiership Rugby Awards 
The following Saracens players have achieved recognition at the annual Premiership Rugby Awards:

Premiership Team of the Decade 
The following Saracens players were named in the Premiership Rugby Team of the Decade for the 2010s. The starting XV is made up of the players who recorded the most appearances in their respective positions, across all teams in the league, between January 2010 and December 2019, with the bench consisting of the players with the second most caps in each position.

Highest scorers by domestic season 
The following lists denote the top try scorers and top points scorers for Saracens during each domestic season from 1997–1998 onwards:

Rugby Players' Association Awards 
The following Saracens players have achieved recognition at the annual RPA Awards:

End-of-season club awards 
The following Saracens players have achieved recognition at the club's annual Big Bash end-of-season awards:

English Premiership record

Results per opposition 
The following table details the past performance of Saracens against different opponents in the English Premiership, between the 1989–90 and 2021–22 seasons.

 Data includes all regular season and play-off matches (semi-finals and finals)
 All fixtures added from 1989–90 to 2021–22

Notes

Additional Sources 
 'The Saracen', Matchday programmes 1998–2007

References

External links 

 
Supporters' Website
BBC Sport Saracens Page
Premiership Rugby Official Website
European Professional Club Rugby Website

 
Premiership Rugby teams
English rugby union teams
Rugby union clubs in London
Rugby union clubs in Hertfordshire
Rugby clubs established in 1876
1876 establishments in England
Heineken Cup champions
Saracens Global Network